Flunk Punk Rumble, known in Japan as  is a manga series written and illustrated by Miki Yoshikawa. The series began as a three-part short story that was later developed into a full series and serialized in Kodansha's Weekly Shōnen Magazine starting October 18, 2006.  It ended on May 18, 2011, with a total of 211 chapters.

References 

Flunk Punk Rumble